Rudy W.G. Demotte (born 3 June 1963 in Ronse) is a Belgian socialist politician who served as 12th Minister-President of Wallonia (2007–2014), replacing Elio Di Rupo, one month after a historical defeat of the socialists in the federal election.

He also served as Minister-President of the French Community between 2008 and 2019.

From 1988 to 1990 he served on the cabinet of the Minister of Social Affairs. He was first elected to the Belgian House of Representatives in 1995 and was reelected in 1999 and 2003. In 1999, he became the federal Minister for Economic Affairs and Scientific Research. In 2002, he became the Minister for Budget, Culture and Sport of the French Community of Belgium. From July 2003 to 2007, he became Minister for Social Affairs and Public Health in the federal government. Having served as a council member from 1994 on, he was mayor of Flobecq (2000–2012). Having moved, since 2013 Demotte is mayor of Tournai.

Orders 
  Grand officier Order of Leopold (2014)
  Order of the Rising Sun, 3rd Class. (2016)

References

External links

  

|-

1963 births
Living people
Members of the Belgian Federal Parliament
Ministers-President of Wallonia
Ministers-President of the French Community of Belgium
Socialist Party (Belgium) politicians
Social affairs ministers
Health ministers
Mayors of places in Belgium
People from Ronse
21st-century Belgian politicians
Recipients of the Order of the Rising Sun, 3rd class